The 1980–81 Boise State Broncos men's basketball team represented Boise State University during the 1980–81 NCAA Division I men's basketball season. The Broncos were led by first-year head coach Dave Leach and played their home games on campus at Bronco Gymnasium in Boise, Idaho.

Leach was hired in March from Oregon State, where he had spent the previous decade as an assistant under  Assistant coach Prescott Smith also moved over from OSU, and was earlier at Portland State.

No Broncos were named to the all-conference team; center Larry McKinney was on the second team.

References

External links
Sports Reference – Boise State Broncos – 1980–81 basketball season

Boise State Broncos men's basketball seasons
Boise State
Boise State